David Oxley (7 November 1920 – 30 October 1985) was an English actor who made many film, television and stage appearances over a 28-year period. He is best known for portraying Gilles de Rais in Saint Joan (1957), Sir Hugo Baskerville in The Hound of the Baskervilles (1959) and for the major role of  Captain W. Stanley Moss in Ill Met by Moonlight (1957), based on the true story of the Kidnap of General Kreipe in 1944.

David Oxley had an extraordinarily powerful voice that he used to great effect, being able to fill an auditorium without the aid of microphones, and seen to best effect as Sir Hugo Baskerville. He trained at the Central School of Dramatic Art in 1946.
His stage work included  early appearances at Stratford, as well as touring New Zealand with J. C. Williamson Theatres in 1961 as Henry Higgins, in one of two original Australasian productions of My Fair Lady.
Oxley suffered a stroke in October, 1985 whilst sunbathing at his hotel in Málaga, Spain. His friend, author Graham Murray, was at his bed-side when he died.
 
He also appeared in Bonjour Tristesse (1958), Sea Fury (1958), Yesterday's Enemy (1959), Life at the Top (1965), Bunny Lake Is Missing (1965) and House of the Living Dead (1974). His television appearances included Danger Man (1960).

Filmography

References

External links

1920 births
1985 deaths
English male stage actors
English male film actors
English male television actors
20th-century English male actors
Alumni of the Royal Central School of Speech and Drama